Modifier may refer to:
 Grammatical modifier, a word that modifies the meaning of another word or limits its meaning
 Compound modifier, two or more words that modify a noun
 Dangling modifier, a word or phrase that modifies a clause in an ambiguous manner
 Modifier key, a kind of key on a computer keyboard that changes the semantics of other keys (e.g. the shift key)
 In 3D computer graphics, an attribute that modifies a polygonal mesh to change its geometry, but preserves the original vertex data
 Car tuner, one who modifies the performance or appearance of a vehicle
 Alphanumeric or numeric two-digit characters used to indicate certain circumstances or changes made to procedural, surgical, service, and supplies codes in the HCPCS clinical coding system

See also
Modification (disambiguation)
Modified (disambiguation)
Single-word modifier (disambiguation)